is a town located in Kitashitara District, Aichi Prefecture, Japan. , the town had an estimated population of 3,033 in 1438 households, and a population density of 24.6 persons per km2.

Geography
Tōei is located in the extreme northeast corner of Aichi Prefecture. Over 90 percent of the town's area is covered by 700 to 1000 meter mountains and forest, and much of the town is within the borders of the Tenryū-Okumikawa Quasi-National Park.

Neighboring municipalities
Aichi Prefecture
Shinshiro
 Kitashitara District
Shitara
Toyone
Shizuoka Prefecture
 Tenryū-ku, Hamamatsu

Demographics
Per Japanese census data, the population of Tōei has decreased drastically, and is now a third of what it was in 1960.

Climate
The town has a climate characterized by characterized by hot and humid summers, and relatively mild winters (Köppen climate classification Cfa).  The average annual temperature in Tōeiis 14.5 °C. The average annual rainfall is 2101 mm with September as the wettest month. The temperatures are highest on average in August, at around 26.1 °C, and lowest in January, at around 3.4 °C.

History
During the Edo period all of present Tōei was tenryō territory under direct control of the Tokugawa shogunate.  After the Meiji Restoration, the area was organized into several villages within Kitashitara District, Aichi including Hongō, Miwa, Midono, Furikusa and Sono with the establishment of the modern municipalities system. In 1900, a portion of Hongō Village split off to become Shimokawa Village. Hongō was elevated to town status on October 1, 1921.

On April 1, 1955 Hongō Town merged with the neighboring villages of Midono, Shimokawa and Sono to form the town of Tōei. The village of Miwa joined the new town the following year, on July 1, 1956.

Economy
The primary industry of Tōei is small-scale forestry, and agriculture. The town derives some revenue from hydroelectric power generation.

Education
Tōei has one public elementary school and one public junior high school operated by the town government. The town does not have a high school.

Transportation

Railway
 Central Japan Railway Company - Iida Line

Highway

Local attractions
 Hana Matsuri is an annual festival held from November through March, in which over 40 performers with wooden masks perform dances and rituals. It has been recognized as an Intangible Important Cultural Property since May 4, 1976.

External links

Notes

 
Towns in Aichi Prefecture